Gazipur Sadar is an upazila (sub-district) of the Gazipur District in central Bangladesh, part of the Dhaka Division.

Gazipur Sadar is one of the five upazilas in the Gazipur district. It is bordered by the upazilas of Sreepur, Kaliganj, and Rupganj in the north and east, and Savar, Rupganj, Uttara Thana, Kaliakoir, and Savar in the south and west.

Geography

Water Bodies
Main rivers: 
Turag
Balu
Labandaha
Salida
Tongi Canal is also a significant water body.

Demographics
According to 1991 Bangladesh census, Gazipur Upazila had a population of 588,492. Men and women made up 97.83% and 90.17% of the population respectively. The entire adult population was 322,434. Gazipur Upazila had an average literacy rate of 95.8% (7+ years), compared to the national average of 95.4%.

Total 866,540; male 471,768, female 394,772; Muslim 817,926, Hindu 45,068, Buddhist 3,185, Christian 188 and others 173. Indigenous communities such as Koach and Rajbangshi belong to this Upazila.

The top attractions to visit in Gazipur are: Nuhash Polli, Bangabandhu Safari Park, Bhawal National Park, Turag Waterfront Resort, and Bangabandhu Sheikh Mujib Safari Park.

Administration
Gazipur Upazila, which was established in 1983, consists of Joydebpur and Tongi police stations.

Gazipur Sadar Upazila Parishad Chairman : Advocate Rina Parvin

Gazipur Sadar Upazila is divided into four union parishads: Baria, Bhaowal Gar, Mirzapur, and Pirujali.

Gazipur City Corporation was formed on 16 January 2013 from Gazipur Municipality, Tongi Municipality, and Gazipur Cantonment.

Gazipur Sadar Upazila Parishad is located near the Dhaka University of Engineering & Technology, Gazipur (DUET), BIDC Road, Gazipur.

Education

There are eight colleges in the Gazipur Sadar Upazila while Bhawal Badre Alam Government College is the only institute offering a master's degree.

According to Banglapedia, Rani Bilashmoni Govt. Boys' High School, founded in 1905, is a notable secondary school.
Rcpsc

There is another great School in Gazipur,It's called Rajendrapur Cantonment Public School & College. Which was founded in 2002. It's in Rajendrapur Cantonment.

See also
 Upazilas of Bangladesh
 Districts of Bangladesh
 Divisions of Bangladesh

References

 
Upazilas of Gazipur District